The Gaehwa Party was a Korean liberal and progressive party founded after the Imo Incident. They were also called the  Independence Party of Joseon, the Innovation Party of Joseon, and the Reformist Faction. They tried to cut off the submissive relationship Korea had to the Qing dynasty and were opposed to what they called the Sadae Party, a group supporting Empress Myeongseong and the Qing dynasty. They reformed domestic affairs, emulating the Empire of Japan's Meiji Restoration. They were also the organization that tried to found an independent Joseon nation. The central figures of this party were Kim Ok-gyun, Hong Yeong-sik, Seo Jae-pil and Seo Gwang-bum. The Conservative Party also participated in enlightening/educational movements, and the Enlightenment Party was also called the Radical Reformist Faction to distinguish between them. 

Ultimately, the coup d'état was crushed by the Qing army, so Enlightenment Party members, such as Kim Ok-gyun, Bak Yeonghyo, Seo Jae-pil, among others, sought asylum in Japan or the United States. 

In 1894, the Japanese occupied Seoul restored King Gojong's father, Heungseon Daewongun, and established a pro-Japanese government under Kim Hong-jip and the Enlightenment Party's administration. They organized three cabinets; their politics were partially supported by the Japanese, indirectly resulting in them aiding and abetting Japan's influence. However, with the rise in popularity of the pro-Russian faction, the Enlightenment Party collapsed.

After the establishment of the Korean Empire, the Gaehwa Party made policy which tried to stop the interruption of Japan.

See also
Gapsin Coup
Gabo Reform
Kim Kyu-sik
Syngman Rhee
Yun Chi-ho

References

Further reading 
Enlightenment party's reformation movements Global Encyclopedia / Daum
Enlightenment party of Joseon Korean Britannica Online

Defunct political parties in Korea
Anti-sadaejuui
Liberal parties in Asia
History of Korea